The Fair Play Index is used in the Super League and Co-operative Championship rugby league competitions as a measure to determine the fairest team over the regular season. The team with the lowest points total wins. As a result of sponsorship from Frontline, the Index is currently officially known as the Frontline Fair Play Index.

Scoring system

* In the Co-operative Championship all penalties count one point.

Winners

Super League Index

Co-operative Championship Index

Reward

The winning team from each competition is presented with a trophy and prize (£5,000 in 2008) at the end-of-season awards ceremonies.

References

Rugby league trophies and awards
Fairplay Index